Rubus michiganensis, known as Michigan dewberry a North American species of dewberry in section Flagellares of the genus Rubus, a member of the rose family. It has been found in the Province of Ontario in central Canada, as well as in the Great Lakes region and in the Appalachian Mountains of the United States (Michigan, Wisconsin, Indiana, Ohio, Pennsylvania, West Virginia, Virginia, Maryland, and New Jersey).

Rubus michiganensis has trailing stems that grow horizontally across the surface of sandy soil or slightly below the surface. These produce herbaceous vertical stems that rise upwards, bearing compound leaves with 3, 5, or 7 leaflets.

References

External links
 

michiganensis
Plants described in 1898
Flora of Ontario
Flora of the United States
Flora without expected TNC conservation status